Hywel ap Rhys ('Hywel son of Rhys') (ruled 886) was a king of Glywysing (either in part or in its entirety) in South Wales.

His sons Arthfael and Owain were probably responsible for the reünification of the realm of Morgannwg. A third son may have fallen helping Rhodri the Great resist a Mercian invasion of Anglesey around 843.

The Houelt Cross

A cross in the collection of ancient stones at St Illtyd's Church, Llantwit Major has been identified with Hywel. The Houelt Cross has a Latin inscription written in half-uncial Latin which has consistently been interpreted as a memorial cross raised by Hywel for his father.

R. A. Stewart Macalister read the inscription as:
"NINOMINEDIPATRISE/TS | PERETUSSANTDIANC | --]UCEMHOUELTPROPE | --]BITPROANIMARESPA | --]ESEUS"

In 1950 Victor Erle Nash-Williams translated it as "In the Name of God the Father and of the Son and of the Holy Spirit. This cross Houelt (PN) prepared for the soul of Res (PN) his father" while in 1976 the Royal Commission on the Ancient and Historical Monuments of Wales translated it as "In the name of God, the Father and the Holy Spirit, Houelt (PN) prepared this cross for the soul of Res (PN) his father".

The Cross itself is a striking example of a Celtic wheel cross and features interlacing carvings, and the work is a lasting reminder of Hywel's wealth and influence.

Children

 Arthfael (died )
 Owain (died )
 Ermithridd
 Nest

References

9th-century Welsh monarchs
Monarchs of Glywysing